Heliamphora glabra (Latin: glaber = bald) is a species of marsh pitcher plant native to Serra do Sol in Venezuela. It was for a long time considered a form of H. heterodoxa, but has recently been raised to species rank.

References

Further reading

  Brewer-Carías, C. (2012). Roraima: madre de todos los ríos. Río Verde 8: 77–94.
  Brewer-Carías, C. (2012–2013). Las plantas carnívoras de los tepuyes. Río Verde 9: 73–88. 
 Fleischmann, A., A. Wistuba & S. McPherson (21 December 2007). Drosera solaris (Droseraceae), a new sundew from the Guayana Highlands. Willdenowia 37(2): 551–555. 
 McPherson, S. (2007). Pitcher Plants of the Americas. The McDonald & Woodward Publishing Company, Blacksburg, Virginia. 
  Wistuba, A., T. Carow, P. Harbarth, & J. Nerz (2005). Heliamphora pulchella, eine neue mit Heliamphora minor (Sarraceniaceae) verwandte Art aus der Chimanta Region in Venezuela. Das Taublatt 53(3): 42–50. 

glabra
Endemic flora of Venezuela
Carnivorous plants of South America
Flora of the Tepuis